John Cocks may refer to:

John Cocks (phycologist) (1787–1861), English botanist
John Cocks, 1st Earl Somers (1760–1841), British peer and politician
John Cocks (builder) (1966–2019), New Zealand TV builder
John C. Cocks (born 1944), American film critic and screenwriter

See also
John Somers-Cocks (disambiguation)
John Cock (disambiguation)
John Cox (disambiguation)